How I Killed My Father is a 2001 French thriller drama film directed by Anne Fontaine.

Plot
Jean-Luc, an established gerontologist, has not had any contact with his father, Maurice, for many years and thinks he is dead. Jean-Luc lost touch when his father left his family to work as a physician in Africa.

Without notice, the father reappears. He is bankrupt and moves into his son's home for several days. He annoys Jean-Luc with compliments that sound like accusations. Or is it Jean-Luc that always hears irony? His wife likes the senior immediately, and even Jean-Luc's younger brother accepts him. Jean-Luc would like to kill his father but...

Cast
Charles Berling as Jean-Luc
Michel Bouquet as Maurice
Natacha Régnier as Isa
Stéphane Guillon as Patrick
Amira Casar as Myriem
Hubert Koundé as Jean-Toussaint
Karole Rocher as Laetitia
François Berléand as The patient

Reception
The review aggregator Rotten Tomatoes reported that 89% of critics have given the film a positive review based on 44 reviews, with an average rating of 7.2/10. The site's critics consensus reads: "How I Killed My Father is a penetrating character study of father-son ties". On Metacritic, the film has a weighted average score of 78 out of 100 based on 18 critics, indicating "generally favorable reviews".

Elvis Mitchell of The New York Times said that "[the film is a] kind of murder mystery, but eventually the only victim is the audience's interest -- the picture is uncompromising and inauspicious".

Lisa Schwarzbaum of Entertainment Weekly commented that "[t]he script is a steady accretion of small stabs to the heart, propelling the gorgeous performances of Berling, Regnier, and especially the 76-year-old French cinema veteran Bouquet, whose every faint smile is killing".

Ty Burr of The Boston Globe wrote "Hushed but scalpel-sharp drama, a [film] that'll probably send men in the audience home much quieter than they arrived".

References

External links

2001 thriller drama films
French thriller drama films
Films directed by Anne Fontaine
Films scored by Jocelyn Pook
2000s French-language films
2000s French films